A functional beverage is a conventional liquid food marketed to highlight specific product ingredients or supposed health benefit.

Functional beverages include dairy beverages, sports and performance drinks, energy drinks, ready-to-drink teas, "smart" drinks, fortified fruit drinks, plant milks, and enhanced water.

Health concerns
Health experts are concerned about the increased consumption and popularity of functional beverages. Although these beverages may serve to hydrate the individual, they may not mitigate health issues, such as obesity, heart disease, and cancer. Most functional beverages are sweetened, and consumption of sweetened beverages is associated with higher levels of obesity and heart disease. Most of these drinks contain significant amounts of sugars and hence calories, which would add to discretionary and total caloric intake. As such, these ingredients pose health risks because of what they contain (sugar and caffeine) or what they replace in the diet (vitamin and mineral-rich foods).

Use 
Functional beverages are commonly consumed by people seeking health benefits from their foods and beverages. Both convenience and health have been identified as important factors in consumers' decision-making about food and beverage purchases. Functional drinks are advertised as having various health benefits. For example, some claim to improve heart health, immunity, digestion, and joint health, while others promote themselves as satiating and energy-boosting.

Industry 
The functional beverage industry is a sub-sector of the functional food and non-alcoholic beverage industry. It is the fastest-growing sector of the industry, partially due to the maturity of the carbonated soft drink sector and heavy investments by major food and beverage companies. Another reason for the industry's growth may be the consumer-oriented market scheme whereby innovative ideas come from consumers. By 2008, in the U.S., the market share of functional beverages accounted for 48.9% of the non-alcoholic industry, which is worth $118 billion.

Functional beverage industry players are generally categorized into four types: 
 Traditional non-alcoholic beverage companies, like PepsiCo, Fuze Beverage, and The Coca-Cola Company. 
 Major food companies, such as Nestlé, Altria, Kraft Foods, General Mills, and the Campbell Soup Company.
 Smaller-scaled private companies and specialized companies like POM Wonderful.
 Agricultural cooperatives, such as Ocean Spray and Sunsweet Growers.

Marketing ethic issue
Although a "functional" beverage may be marketed as a panacea or a performance-enhancing substance, there is no scientific evidence for any specific health effects of such beverages or for their uniform regulation internationally, as of 2020.

Market 

The functional beverage industry generally competes using four primary strategies:
 Promote their own products as healthy and unique, by clearly distinguishing their health claims from similar products, and by specifying naturally healthy ingredients.
 Consider extensions of existing brand lines. For example, Nestle extended their Boost product line by adding Kids Essentials to the line, thereby extending the adult-focused Boost line to a new market (children).
 Larger companies compete for market share by acquiring smaller companies that may own a particular market sector. For example, Coca-Cola purchased Glaceau from Energy Brands, and Odwalla and Fuze Beverage from their respective founders, in order to increase Coca-Cola's market share.
 Explore new functional brands by identifying new markets and demands.

Market segments of the functional beverage industry are divided mainly into four parts. Those include hydration; energy/rejuvenation; health and wellness; and weight management. Each segment has its own target market and consumers. Overlapping of target consumers does occur—not because of undefined market needs, but due to consumer acceptance of functional beverages.

Energy and stimulation 
Highly caffeinated, often highly sweetened "energy drinks" have become popular on the beverage market in the United States, as well as globally, in the past decade. Consumer demand has helped generate a new generation of "energy drink" brands containing similar amounts of caffeine, calories, and sugar.

Various stimulants found in energy drinks may include taurine, caffeine, B vitamins, guarana, ginseng, ginkgo biloba, L-carnitine, sugars, yerba maté, and creatine. Although these ingredients have been approved by the FDA, health experts still recommend that consumers read their energy drinks' labels, as these ingredients may not improve health.

Sales
As of 2008, based on dollar sales, the most popular functional beverages, in order, were:
 Health and wellness drinks, with 62.2% of dollar sales
 Hydration drinks (28%)
 Energy/Rejuvenation drinks (8.4%)
 Weight Management drinks (1.2%)

Consumer demographic 
According to a 2006 article, the functional beverage market's consumer group is characterized as well-educated females aged 35–55, belonging to the upper middle, middle, and lower middle classes. This is thought to result from this group's perceptions that functional drinks produce positive health beliefs, as well as their relatively high disposable income. A 2002 article stated that within the energy and stimulant drink sector, young adults aged 18 to 34 are considered to be the main target market, as evidenced by high consumption rates. However, due to constant changes in attitudes about different types of functional beverages, these target markets could change.

Energy drinks 

In some functional beverages, particularly energy drinks, the caffeine content can range from 50 to 200 milligrams per serving. According to Health Canada, beverage products with variable levels of caffeine may not be safe for children.

See also 

 Functional food
 Medical food

Notes

References